BIPA Odesa is a professional basketball club based in Odesa, Ukraine. In the 2015–16 season, the team entered the Ukrainian Basketball SuperLeague, the top tier league in Ukraine. In December 2017, BIPA Odesa went under the ownership of BC Dynamo Odesa, but completed the 2017-2018 season under the name "BIPA". BC Dynamo Odesa was promoted to the  Superleague for the season 2018-2019. BIPA and BC Dynamo merged and changed name to BC Odesa. 

However, refounded BIPA Odesa started to play in lower divisions. In 2020-21 season, club won Higher League of Ukraine (second division). In 2022-23 season team merged with BC Khimik and began to play in Superleague under the war circumstances.

Season by season

References

External links
Official website 

Basketball teams in Ukraine
Sport in Odesa
Basketball teams established in 2015
2015 establishments in Ukraine